Menotti de Tomazzo Sobrinho (born 15 March 1943) is a Brazilian former footballer.

References

1943 births
Living people
Brazilian footballers
Association football midfielders
Sociedade Esportiva Palmeiras players
Pan American Games medalists in football
Pan American Games gold medalists for Brazil
Footballers at the 1963 Pan American Games
Medalists at the 1963 Pan American Games